The Rural Retreat Depot is a historic railroad station at 105 Railroad Avenue in Rural Retreat, Virginia.  Built c. 1870, it is one of the oldest railroad stations in Southwest Virginia, and one of only two to survive from the Reconstruction Era.  Its distinctive Italianate features include a pair of square towers, and wide shallow eaves with paired brackets.

The depot features in a number of photographs and audio recordings by O. Winston Link.

The depot was listed on the National Register of Historic Places in 2014.

See also
National Register of Historic Places in Wythe County, Virginia

References

Railway stations on the National Register of Historic Places in Virginia
Railway stations in the United States opened in 1902
National Register of Historic Places in Wythe County, Virginia
Buildings and structures in Wythe County, Virginia